Potter's Pass, is situated in the Eastern Cape, province of South Africa, near East London.

Mountain passes of the Eastern Cape